, Uzbekistan Airways flies to the following list of destinations. Terminated destinations are also listed.

List

See also

Transport in Uzbekistan

References

External links

Lists of airline destinations